Coogee is an electoral district of the Legislative Assembly in the Australian state of New South Wales. It is represented by Marjorie O'Neill of the Australian Labor Party.

Coogee includes the suburbs of Bondi, Bondi Junction, Bronte, Clovelly, Coogee, Queens Park,  South Coogee, Tamarama and Waverley and parts of Kingsford, Maroubra, Randwick and the University of New South Wales.

Members for Coogee

Election results

References

Coogee
Constituencies established in 1927
1927 establishments in Australia